The Ontario Debutante Stakes is a Canadian Thoroughbred horse race run annually in mid-August at Woodbine Racetrack in Toronto, Ontario. Open to Two-year-old Fillies, it is contested over Six furlongs on Polytrac synthetic dirt.

From 1989 through 1993 and from 1995 through 1997, the Ontario Debutante Stakes was hosted by Fort Erie Racetrack in Fort Erie, Ontario. The race was run in two divisions in 1979.

Records
Speed  record: 
 1:09.75 - Knights Templar (2005)

Most wins by an owner:
 3 - Kinghaven Farms (1982, 1983, 2000)

Most wins by a jockey:
 5 - David Clark (1979, 1980, 1987, 1989, 2006)

Most wins by a trainer:
 3 - Roger Attfield (1995, 2000, 2004)

Winners

References
 The Ontario Debutante Stakes at Pedigree Query
 The Ontario Debutante Stakes at Woodbine Racetrack

Ungraded stakes races in Canada
Flat horse races for two-year-old fillies
Recurring sporting events established in 1979
Woodbine Racetrack
1979 establishments in Ontario